Arthur Hayes may refer to:

 Arthur Hayes (cricketer) (1923–1999), South African cricketer
 Arthur Hayes (banker), American banker and entrepreneur
 Arthur H. Hayes Jr. (1933–2010), American pharmacologist, medical educator and government agency head

See also
Arthur Hays (disambiguation)